The New Rochelle Yacht Club (NRYC), formerly situated on Harrison Island with its anchorage in Echo Bay, was one of the foremost yacht clubs  on Long Island Sound during the late nineteenth early twentieth century. The club was organized in 1885 and for several years had its headquarters on Harrison Island. Later it moved to the mainland occupying a larger site in Hudson Park on Echo Bay, and in 1901 was moved back again to Harrison Island, occupying the entire island.

From its inception the club was a leader among those organizations which catered particularly to the sailing element of yachtsmen, the percentage of boat owners always particularly high. When the first long-distance race for small boats from Sandy Hook to Marblehead was planned in 1904, the NRYC came to the fore with several entries, and later, when the Bermuda races started, the NRYC sent more boats in these contests than any other organization. The club always stood for the very best there was in the sport, and the rocking chair fleet was usually conspicuous by its absence, the club devoting its energies to developing real sailors than the social end of the pastime. Yachting It has turned out many notable sailors and its burgee was known in practically every known harbor between New York City and Newport.

Its regattas were better attended than any club on Long Island Sound.

The New Rochelle Yacht Club, on Harrison Island, was destroyed by fire in 1926.

References

Geography of New Rochelle, New York
History of New Rochelle, New York
Long Island Sound
Sailing in New York (state)
Sports clubs established in 1885
Yacht clubs in the United States
Defunct yacht clubs